Michael Davis (born 1 August 1961) is a Scottish film director, producer and screenwriter.

Born in Glasgow and raised in the Gorbals, Davis was bed-ridden with asthma during his childhood. When he outgrew the condition, he worked as a fitness coach for the football team Celtic F.C. where he met and befriended the singer Rod Stewart, an ardent supporter of Celtic. When Davis moved to Los Angeles to begin a career in screenwriting, Stewart introduced him to people in showbusiness to give his career a start.

Davis' first major credit was as screenwriter on Love in Paris (also called Another 9½ Weeks, a sequel to 9½ Weeks). In 1999, he made his directorial debut with The Match, a football-themed romantic comedy filmed in Scotland. In 2004, he directed Modigliani, a biography of the artist Amedeo Modigliani. In 2013, Davis wrote, produced and directed a short film, Haunting Charles Manson, and the next year, a feature-length version of the same film.

References

External links

1961 births
Living people
Scottish screenwriters
Scottish film directors
People from Gorbals